WIGY-FM (100.7 FM) is a radio station licensed to serve Mexico, Maine. The station is owned by Stan Bennett, through licensee Bennett Radio Group, LLC. Established in 1988 as WTBM, WIGY-FM broadcasts a country music format, which it simulcasts with WOXO-FM (92.7).

History
WIGY-FM signed on September 15, 1988, as WTBM, owned by Tanist Broadcasting Corporation and programming country music, album-oriented rock, and adult contemporary music. Mountain Valley Broadcasting bought WTBM in 1990 and converted it to a simulcast of WOXO-FM (92.7). The station took on the WOXO-FM call letters on August 1, 2016; the call sign became available to 100.7 after the 92.7 FM facility became hot adult contemporary station WEZR-FM, with WOXO's country music programming airing on 100.7 FM and on WOXO (1450 AM and 96.9 FM).

In April 2019, the country format moved from WOXO back to WEZR-FM, retaining the simulcast on WOXO-FM. On September 27, 2019, the WEZR-FM call sign moved to 100.7, with 92.7 returning to WOXO-FM; on October 8, 100.7's call sign was changed to WRMO-FM.

WRMO-FM, along with its sister stations, went off the air March 29, 2020, citing financial considerations that included expected reduction in advertising revenue attributed to COVID-19. The stations had been up for sale following the death of owner Dick Gleason in February 2019. A sale of the Gleason Media Group stations to Bennett Radio Group was announced in May 2020, and was consummated on August 5, 2020, at a sale price of $300,000.

On August 9, 2020, WRMO-FM changed its call letters to WIGY-FM and returned to the air on August 10, once again simulcasting WOXO-FM as "WOXO Country".

References

External links

IGY-FM
Oxford County, Maine
Radio stations established in 1988
1988 establishments in Maine
Country radio stations in the United States